John Joseph Anthony Byrne (born 24 March 1949) is an English footballer, who played as a winger in the Football League for Tranmere Rovers.

References

External links

Tranmere Rovers F.C. players
Cammell Laird 1907 F.C. players
Association football wingers
English Football League players
Living people
1949 births
English footballers